Fantastic Four: World's Greatest Heroes is an animated television series based on the Marvel Comics' Fantastic Four comic book series. This is the team's fourth foray into animation. The series is co-produced by American company Marvel Entertainment and French company MoonScoop Group, with the participation of M6 and Cartoon Network Europe, and distributed by Taffy Entertainment.

Airing
In the United States, the show had an erratic airing schedule on Cartoon Network, having premiered as part of Toonami on September 2, 2006. It ran for only eight of the season's 26 episodes before being pulled. It subsequently returned to the network starting June 9, 2007, shortly before the release of the film Fantastic Four: Rise of the Silver Surfer. The second launch of the show aired only nine episodes, leaving nine installments not televised in the USA. The show aired on Boomerang for a brief time before moving to Nicktoons in 2009 for the final episodes. The series was produced in 16:9 widescreen, although it was letterboxed or cropped when broadcast.

Plot
World's Greatest Heroes is not directly connected to any of the previous iterations of the Fantastic Four, telling its own version of the team's origin and their encounters with their rogues gallery. Unlike its 1994 predecessor, which consisted almost entirely of straight or modified reinterpretations of classic Fantastic Four comic book stories, World's Greatest Heroes features mostly original stories, though elements from various comic iterations of the Fantastic Four were used in the series.

Cast
 Hiro Kanagawa - Reed Richards/Mister Fantastic
 Lara Gilchrist - Susan "Sue" Storm/Invisible Woman
 Christopher Jacot - Jonathan "Johnny" Spencer Storm/Human Torch
 Brian Dobson - Benjamin "Ben" Grimm/The Thing, Flatman
 Sam Vincent - H.E.R.B.I.E., Trapster, Peter Parker
 Paul Dobson - Victor Von Doom/Doctor Doom, Mole Man, Captain Ultra, Doombots
 Sunita Prasad - Alicia Masters

Guest stars
 Mark Acheson - Attuma
 Michael Adamthwaite - Namor
 Don Brown - Henry Peter Gyrich
 Trevor Devall - Diablo
 Michael Dobson - Ronan the Accuser, Mr. Bonner-Davis
 Brian Drummond - Agent Pratt
 Laura Drummond - Courtney Bonner-Davis
 Mark Gibbon - Hulk
 Jonathan Holmes - Wizard
 Andrew Kavadas - Dr. Bruce Banner
 David Kaye - Tony Stark/Iron Man
 Terry Klassen - Impossible Man
 Scott McNeil - Annihilus
 Colin Murdock - Willie Lumpkin
 Peter New - Rupert the Geek
 John Novak - Supreme Intelligence
 Mark Oliver - Cmd. Kl'rt/Super-Skrull
 John Payne - Hank Pym/Ant-Man
 Alvin Sanders - Phillip Master/Puppet Master
 Rebecca Shoichet - Jennifer Walters/She-Hulk, Squirrel Girl
 Venus Terzo - Lucia von Bardas
 Lee Tockar - Terminus

Episodes

Home releases

References

External links
  at Marvel.com, with full episodes viewable online
 
 Marvel names Cartoon Network Exclusive U.S. Broadcast home for all-new Fantastic Four Animated Series
 Cast announcement
 Plots of the first episodes 
 September 2006 conference call with Executive Producer Craig Kyle and Head Fantastic Four writer/Story Editor Chris Yost.

Fantastic Four television series
2006 American television series debuts
2010 American television series endings
2000s American animated television series
2010s American animated television series
2000s American science fiction television series
2010s American science fiction television series
2006 Canadian television series debuts
2010 Canadian television series endings
2000s Canadian animated television series
2010s Canadian animated television series
2000s Canadian science fiction television series
2010s Canadian science fiction television series
2006 French television series debuts
2010 French television series endings
2000s French animated television series
2010s French animated television series
French children's animated action television series
French children's animated adventure television series
French children's animated science fantasy television series
French children's animated superhero television series
Canadian children's animated action television series
Canadian children's animated adventure television series
Canadian children's animated science fantasy television series
Canadian children's animated superhero television series
American children's animated action television series
American children's animated adventure television series
American children's animated science fantasy television series
American children's animated superhero television series
English-language television shows
Cartoon Network original programming
Animated television series based on Marvel Comics
Animated series produced by Marvel Studios
Anime-influenced Western animated television series
Television shows based on Marvel Comics
Television series by Splash Entertainment
Works by Christopher Yost
Toonami
YTV (Canadian TV channel) original programming